The Worshipful Company of Distillers is one of the Livery Companies of the City of London. The Distillers' Company was incorporated under a Royal Charter in 1638 as proposed by Thomas Cademan and Theodore de Mayerne, physicians to Queen Henrietta Maria. It was empowered to regulate and supervise the production of spirits and liquors. Nowadays, the Company no longer exercises such powers but focuses on charitable distributions, including educational scholarships and bursaries.

The Distillers' Company ranks sixty-ninth in the order of precedence of City Livery Companies and its membership, comprising executives from the drinks industry and those whose families were involved in the distilling business, enjoys an active social life.

A short history of the Company by Michael Berlin was published in 1996, and its heraldic motto is Drop as Rain, Distil as Dew.

References

External links
Worshipful Company of Distillers Website

Distillers
1638 establishments in England
Charities based in London